The Kansas City Roos women's basketball team represents the University of Missouri-Kansas City in Kansas City, Missouri. The school's team currently competes in the Summit League.

History
UMKC began play in 1980. They competed in the NAIA from 1980 to 1987, going 159–48 while finishing 3rd in 1983 and 5th in 1985. They played in the Mid-Continent Conference/Summit League from 1994 to 2013 before joining the WAC in 2013. They have never played in the Division I NCAA Tournament, but they have played in the Women's Basketball Invitational in 2010 and the WNIT in 2012. As of the end of the 2015–16 season, they have an all-time record of 336–488.

Season by season

Source:

Postseason

NAIA
The Kangaroos appeared in two NAIA Tournaments. Their record is 3–2.

WBI
The Kangaroos appeared in one Women's Basketball Invitational (WBI). Their record is 0–1.

WNIT
The Kangaroos appeared in one WNIT. Their record is 0–1.

References

External links